Ámbar Andrea Soruco Córdova (born 3 March 1996) is a Chilean footballer who plays as a right back for Santiago Morning and the Chile women's national team.

Club career
Soruco played for Spanish club EDF Logroño in the 2018–2019 Primera División season.

References 

1996 births
Living people
Sportspeople from Viña del Mar
Chilean women's footballers
Women's association football fullbacks
Everton de Viña del Mar footballers
Universidad de Chile footballers
Santiago Morning (women) footballers
Primera División (women) players
EdF Logroño players
Chile women's international footballers
Chilean expatriate women's footballers
Chilean expatriate sportspeople in Brazil
Expatriate women's footballers in Brazil
Chilean expatriate sportspeople in Spain
Expatriate women's footballers in Spain